Baby is a 2015 Indian Hindi-language spy action thriller film written and directed by Neeraj Pandey. The film stars Akshay Kumar, Anupam Kher, Rana Daggubati, Danny Denzongpa, Taapsee Pannu, Kay Kay Menon, Mikaal Zulfiqar, Madhurima Tuli and Rasheed Naz. It follows an elite team of the Indian intelligence system, which perpetually strives to detect and eliminate terrorists and their plots, during which an officer leads a team to destroy one such potentially lethal operation.

Filming began on 4 September 2014 in Greater Noida, Uttar Pradesh. It was shot in Gautam Buddha University, Nepal, Abu Dhabi and Istanbul. The film was released on 23 January 2015 and met to generally positive reviews from critics who particularly praised the writing, direction, hailed action sequences and Kumar's performance. It was a critical and commercial success, grossing over  worldwide.

A prequel titled Naam Shabana began filming in September 2016, with Pannu in the lead role as Shabana Khan. With Kumar in a special appearance, it was released on 31 March 2017.

Plot 
BABY is a temporary task force headed by Feroz Ali Khan is formed in response to the 26/11 attacks in India, their job is to find and eliminate terrorists planning attacks in India. While attempting to rescue a fellow secret agent in Turkey, Ajay Singh Rajput captures a former colleague-turned-traitor, Jamal. Ajay threatens to have his family killed unless provides the information about a terror attack plan. Jamaal tells Ajay about a plot to carry out a bomb blast in a Delhi shopping mall, which Ajay is able to prevent with help from Jai. Jamaal then taunts Ajay saying that this was only the first of a series of massive attacks that the terrorists had planned and commits suicide. 

Pakistan-based terrorist mastermind, Maulana Mohammed Abdul Rehman, is causing trouble near the India-Pakistan border. He plans an escape plan for Bilal Khan, a dangerous terrorist lodged in a prison in Mumbai. For this purpose, Bilal assigns another terrorist Javed Ali Khan who arrives in Mumbai via Dubai. Soon after, Bilal escapes from police custody and flees the country. The Indian agencies are alerted to Javed's arrival and a team of ATS officers, led by Ajay, is dispatched to interrogate Taufiq, an ISI agent posing as a local Muslim leader. Ajay manages to get information on Javed after torturing Taufiq and raids Javed's hideout. However, things go haywire when all the officers except Ajay get killed along with Javed after the latter triggers a suicide explosion. 

The agency is able to retrieve the remains of Javed's laptop and find a name from the hard drive: Wasim Khan/Wasim Sheikh, a logistics planner for the terrorist groups living in Nepal under the name of Abdul Haq. Ajay and Shabana Khan travel to Nepal pretending to be a married couple. Their plan to capture Wasim goes awry when he finds out that Shabana is a covert operative. However, Shabana fights with him and knocks him unconscious and the duo bring Wasim back to India. Afraid of the torture that he might face, Wasim reveals all the information that the agency wants. He tells them that Bilal is in al-Dera in Saudi Arabia and will travel to Karachi to launch a lethal attack on numerous locations in India.

Feroz sends Ajay, Jai, and Shukla to meet their deep asset, Ashfaq, in Al-Dirah. Bilal is holding meetings in Al-Dirah to discuss the funding and execution of the terrorist attacks. With Shukla's help, Ajay and Jai break into Bilal's room and kill him. As they are about to return, they find that Maulana is also present at the suite. Jai knocks him out. They decide to bring him back to India, under the pretext that he is Ashfaq's uncle who needs to visit India for an urgent liver transplant. They manage to get a visa from the local authorities for Maulana (being shown as Ashfaq's ill uncle), but the hotel security discovers Bilal's corpse. The Police Chief Hani Mohammad starts investigating Bilal's death. He quickly identifies Ajay and his team as Indian agents. 

Rehman regains consciousness and suddenly attacks and wounds Ajay, who manages to subdue him. Ajay and his team then board the plane, but Hani contacts the ATC and asks them to stop the aircraft. However, when he sees a newspaper that reveals that Maulana and Bilal are wanted terrorists with an international bounty on their heads, he smiles and lets the plane take off without any further hindrance. Maulana is brought to India, but his capture was kept a secret. After 6 weeks of interrogation, Maulana's required information is extracted, where he is handed over to the Indian Army and taken to Srinagar. Maulana is given the same treatment by the army as given to militants (implying that he was eliminated). The trial run is successful, and BABY is given permanent status where the agents celebrate their victory.

Cast
Akshay Kumar as Ajay Singh Rajput / Rafiq Khan / Rahul Awasthi
Danny Denzongpa as Feroz Ali Khan, Ajay's boss
Taapsee Pannu as Shabana Khan, undercover agent and Ajay's fake wife
Madhurima Tuli as Anjali Rajput, Ajay's wife
Rana Daggubati as Jai Singh Rathod / Vijay Sharma
Anupam Kher as Omprakash Shukla / Brijmohan Singh
Kay Kay Menon as Bilal Khan / Firdaus Ali / Jameel Rashid
Sushant Singh as Wasim Khan / Abdul Haq
Jameel Khan as Taufiq Aalam
Mikaal Zulfiqar as Ashfaque Qazi
Amar Talwar as Minister Dhanraj Pradhan
Murali Sharma as Jagdish Gupta, Pradhan's secretary
Rasheed Naz as Maulana Mohammed Abdul Rehman / Abbas Sheikh
Sanjeev Tyagi as Police Inspector Raghuveer Chabbra
Hasan Noman as Hani Mohammed, Officer of Al-Dera Police who investigates Bilal's murder
Karan Aanand as Jamal
Rumi Khan as Javed Ali Khan
Niharica Raizada as Reporter Priya Jhaveri
Sajjad Delafrooz as Doctor in Saudi Al-Dera
Esha Gupta in a special appearance in the Song "Beparwah"

Production

Baby was produced under T-Series along with Crouching Tiger, Friday Filmworks and Cape of Good Films. The filming began on 4 September 2014, in Greater Noida, Uttar Pradesh. Some filming was done in Gautam Buddha University, at Meditation Hall, Shanti Sarover and Library, at Greater Noida. The second part was shot in Nepal and the team completed their final schedule in Abu Dhabi in October. Some parts were also shot in Istanbul. Sajjad Delafrooz was hired to play the role of the Saudi doctor.

Soundtrack

The songs for the film features songs composed by MM Keeravani and Meet Bros Anjjan. Lyrics were written by Manoj Muntashir.

The film score was composed by Sanjoy Chowdhury.

Release and reception

Critical response
Baby was released to positive reviews.

Subhash K. Jha gave the film 4.5 stars out of 5 and stated,"Baby is one helluva roller-coaster ride. Miss it at your own risk." Sarita A Tanwar of Daily News and Analysis gave the movie 4 stars, describing Akshay Kumar's performance in the movie as his career-best. Anuj Kumar of The Hindu summarized the film as "A gripping espionage thriller that eschews drama and jingoism". Srijana Mitra Das of The Times of India also gave it 4 stars out of 5 and said, "Akshay Kumar is terrific as Ajay whose core of steel you can almost feel". Hindustan Times gave the movie 4 stars out of 5 too, calling the film "sleek, well-timed and engaging." Yahoo Movies gave the film 4 stars and wrote, "The film deals with a definite conflict, backs it up with a coherent plot trajectory and delivers a compelling resolution." Anupama Chopra gave the film 3.5 stars and stating that the movie will make  the viewers forget Akshay's cinematic misdemeanours. Rajeev Masand gave the film 3 stars, hailing its action sequences and performance of the cast. Shubhra Gupta of The Indian Express gave the film 2 stars. However, Gupta praised Akshay  Kumar's performance. Devesh Sharma of Filmfare praised the breathtaking action of the movie and gave it 3 stars. Ritika Handoo of Zee News hailed the movie as an entertaining  movie which is a must-watch. Saibal Chatterjee of NDTV gave the movie two stars  calling the movie as politically dodgy in spite of being a smartly-packaged, competently shot espionage thriller. Shubha Shetty-Saha of Mid-Day gave the movie 4 stars, calling it a must-watch movie. Mihir Fadnavis of Firstpost didn't give positive reviews to the plot but praised the movie as entertaining and fast-paced. Mayank Shekhar of ABP News gave 3 stars and wrote that the film manages to hold viewers attention. Abhishek Gupta of India TV said the film is "fast-paced and entertaining" and that it "goads by making a point that while America executed their plan to kill the 9/11 mastermind in Abbottabad, here, our politicians could just make loud promises " about the 26/11 attacks. Bollywood Hungama praised the "exceptional" cinematography; the "extremely gripping" storyline, which makes appropriate use of the actors; the score, which "instills the necessary emotions"; and Kumar's performance. It concluded, "On the whole, Baby is one of the finest films ever made in the history of Indian cinema" and gave it 4.5 out of 5 stars. R. M. Vijayakar of The New Indian Express gave 3.5 ratings calling it "that near-perfect textbook espionage thriller we have been dying to see: straight and business-like, fast-paced, without frills, and immaculately detailed to the point of occasional verbosity"

Ban in Pakistan
Baby was banned in Pakistan by the censor boards in Islamabad and Karachi, which said that "it portrays a negative image of Muslims and the negative characters in the film also have Muslim names".

Box office

Prequel and spin-offs

A prequel titled Naam Shabana was released on 31 March 2017. The film features Tapsee Pannu as Shabana Khan in the lead and Akshay Kumar in an extended cameo role. Neeraj Pandey is planning four more spin-offs based on different characters from the film.

Game
An official game based on this film has been released by Vroovy, for Android mobile phone users.

Awards and nominations

References

External links

T-Series (company) films
2015 films
2015 action thriller films
2010s spy thriller films
India–Pakistan relations in popular culture
Indian action thriller films
Indian spy thriller films
2010s Hindi-language films
Films directed by Neeraj Pandey
Films set in Nepal
Films shot in Uttar Pradesh
Films shot in Kathmandu
Films shot in Nepal
Films shot in Istanbul
Films about terrorism in India
Films scored by M. M. Keeravani
Hindi films remade in other languages
Indian detective films
Films about the Research and Analysis Wing
Films scored by Sanjoy Chowdhury